The Belegezites (Belegezitai) were a South Slavic (Sklavenoi) tribe that lived in the area of Thessaly in the Early Middle Ages. They are one of the tribes listed in the Miracles of Saint Demetrius.

Geography

According to the Miracles of Saint Demetrius, they were settled around Demetrias and Phthiotic Thebes on the northern shores of the Pagasetic Gulf. The same area is still called Belechatouia (Velechativa in Latin) in the chrysobull of 1198 granting privileges to the Republic of Venice, and in the 1204 Partitio Romaniae. At the time, it formed an imperial episkepsis (fiscal district). The later, 13th/14th-century name "land of the Levachatai" (γῆ τῶν Λεβαχάτων), and the name of the village Levache (Λεβάχη), both found in the cadasters of the Lykousada Monastery, also possibly derive from the same locality.

History 
After settling in the region of Thessaly, the economic activities of the tribe included trade with the Byzantine city of Thessaloniki by 670–80. When the city was besieged by the Sagudates, Drogubites and other tribes in the late 7th century, the leaders of the Belegezites provided supplies for the besieged population. During the same period, along with other tribes they were using armed logboats to plunder the coasts of Thessaly. One of the leaders of the tribe in the late 7th century was a person named Tihomir, whose name has been found on artifacts of the same period. Religious buildings of the 8th century in Thessaly have been connected with the Christianization of the tribe, after the campaigns of Byzantine emperor Nikephoros I against the Slavs of the area.

Annotations
Their name is rendered in English as Belegezites, Velegesites, Belegizites and Velzite Slavs. In Macedonian, Bulgarian and Serbian, Velegeziti is used.

References

Sources 
 
 

Medieval Thessaly
7th century in the Byzantine Empire
Sclaveni